The Figari Award is given annually to visual artists from Uruguay in recognition of their careers. It was instituted in 1995 by the Central Bank of Uruguay, at the initiative of the then president of the institution, economist and sculptor .

It is a recognition of artists in activity that represents a consecration in their line of work. Of non-competitive nature, in each edition an organizing committee proposes a qualified jury that is in charge of analyzing the situation of the most outstanding artists, reviewing their achievements, career, and impact in the local and international scope.

Format
Since its inception, the modality and format of the award has been changing, although not its purpose. In the first edition a call was made, five finalists were selected, and a First Prize was awarded. As of the second edition, the competition was eliminated and three prizes of equal economic value were awarded. Some editions were characterized by rewarding three artists of the same discipline or with similar formal characteristics.

Beginning in its tenth edition, the participation of the Uruguayan Association of Art Critics (AUCA) was included in the selection and organization. This lasted until 2009, when a loan agreement was signed with the Ministry of Education and Culture and the award began to be managed by the National Directorate of Culture, and the "Figari Space" became the headquarters of the Museo Figari.

Since its 15th edition, the Figari Award has been given annually to a single artist, in recognition of his or her career and encouragement to national creation.

In 2011, a retrospective was held at the National Museum of Visual Arts with the works of the 47 artists honored in the award's 15 editions.

Recognition of artistic work
With its name, the prize pays homage to Pedro Figari (1861–1938), one of the most influential figures in the gestation of an integral awareness of the Uruguayan artistic milieu. As a lawyer, legislator, politician, journalist, teacher, and artist, Figari's activity was marked by a vital concern for cultural issues, the recognition of local values and the creation of a national cultural identity.

Awards

From the loan agreement signed between the Central Bank of Uruguay and the MEC in 2009, the Figari Award began to be managed by the National Directorate of Culture of the MEC and the Museo Figari. That year the award was not given, and since 2010 it has been delivered to a single artist in each edition.

References

1995 establishments in Uruguay
Arts awards in Uruguay
Awards established in 1995